The name Juliet has been used for two tropical cyclones, one in the Atlantic Ocean and one in the southwestern Indian Ocean. 
 Tropical Storm Juliet (1978), formed near Puerto Rico. and dissipated west-southwest of Bermuda
  Cyclone Juliet (2005), formed near the Cocos (Keeling) Islands as Severe Tropical Cyclone Adeline.

Juliet *
Juliet *